Litchfield Township is one of the seventeen townships of Medina County, Ohio, United States.  The 2000 census found 3,250 people in the township.

Geography
Located in the west part of the county, it borders the following townships:
Grafton Township, Lorain County - north
Liverpool Township - northeast corner
York Township - east
Lafayette Township - southeast corner
Chatham Township - south
Spencer Township - southwest corner
Penfield Township, Lorain County - west
LaGrange Township, Lorain County - northwest corner

No municipalities are located in Litchfield Township, although the unincorporated community of Litchfield lies at the center of the township.

Name and history
Litchfield Township was organized in 1831. Named after Litchfield, Connecticut, it is the only Litchfield Township statewide.

Government
The township is governed by a three-member board of trustees, who are elected in November of odd-numbered years to a four-year term beginning on the following January 1. Two are elected in the year after the presidential election and one is elected in the year before it. There is also an elected township fiscal officer, who serves a four-year term beginning on April 1 of the year after the election, which is held in November of the year before the presidential election. Vacancies in the fiscal officership or on the board of trustees are filled by the remaining trustees.

References

External links
County website

Townships in Medina County, Ohio
Townships in Ohio